Yo Ho Ho is a 1981 Bulgarian drama film directed by Zako Heskiya and written by Valeri Petrov. It was entered into the 12th Moscow International Film Festival where it won a Special Prize. The 2006 film The Fall by Tarsem Singh is based on Yo Ho Ho.

Plot
A 10-year-old boy with a broken arm befriends a young, paraplegic actor in the hospital. Together, the two make up a pirate story in which they play the main roles. The boy, Leonid, starts to visit the actor's room, which also houses a poor old man, every day. In the made-up story, he becomes the evil adversary of the pirates.

Little by little, everyone in the hospital gets their roles in the story. Leonid is fascinated. But in order for the story to continue, the boy has to steal bottles of medicine for the actor, who no longer has any joy in life and plans a suicide. It is only when the boy falls down and hits his head during one of those occurrences, that the actor realises that life has meaning as long as you have friends.

At the end of the—real and fictional—story, the two resist the villain in the room and hijack his sick bed with a cane.

Cast
 Kiril Variyski as the Actor / the Black Pirate
 Viktor Chouchkov as Leonid
 Iliya Penev as Unpleasant Old Man / the Governor
 Anani Anev as Gogo / Sitting Bull
 Sonya Djulgerova as Nurse Ceci / Cicilly
 Kirill Kavadarkov as Van Lun
 Georgi Bakhchevanov as Rosko
 Trifon Dzhonev as Luigi
 Boris Lukanov as the Professor
 Rut Spasova as Leonid's mother
 Vasil Stoychev as the Actor's colleague

References

External links
 
 Yo Ho Ho at Bulgarian National Film Archive

1981 films
1981 drama films
1980s Bulgarian-language films
Bulgarian drama films
Films set in Bulgaria
Films shot in Bulgaria